Sulfur oxygenase may refer to:
 Sulfur dioxygenase, an enzyme
 Sulfur oxygenase/reductase, an enzyme